Prince Adalbert may refer to

 Prince Adalbert of Prussia (1811–1873), Prussian admiral
 Prince Adalbert of Bavaria (1828–1875), son of Ludwig I of Bavaria and Therese of Saxe-Hildburghausen
 Prince Adalbert of Prussia (1884–1948), son of Wilhelm II, German Emperor and Princess Augusta Victoria of Schleswig-Holstein
 Prince Adalbert of Bavaria (1886–1970), German prince, author, and diplomat

See also
Prinz Adalbert (disambiguation)